This is a list of films which placed number-one at the Weekly box office in Hong Kong during 2021.

Highest-grossing films

See also
 List of Hong Kong films of 2021
 List of 2022 box office number-one films in Hong Kong

References

Hong Kong
2021 in Hong Kong
Hong Kong film-related lists
2021